The OECS Track and Field Championships is an annual track and field competition between athletes representing one of the member states of the Organisation of Eastern Caribbean States (OECS). This event started in 1986 and was first held at Queen’s Park, in Grenada. The second was also held in Grenada and thereafter moved around the OECS until 1992. Under the auspices of the OECS Athletics Congress (OAC) the first edition of the revived OECS Track and Field Championships was held in St. Kitts in 2014.

Editions

Championships records

Men

Women

References

Athletics competitions in the Caribbean
Track
Recurring sporting events established in 1986